Harry O, sometimes spelled Harry-O, is an American private detective series that aired for two seasons on ABC from 1974 to 1976. The series starred David Janssen, and Jerry Thorpe was executive producer. Harry O followed the broadcast of two pilot films: firstly Such Dust as Dreams Are Made On (which aired on March 11, 1973) and secondly (with noticeable retooling) Smile Jenny, You're Dead (which aired on February 3, 1974), both starring Janssen.

Synopsis
David Janssen starred as the title character Harry Orwell, a San Diego cop forced into retirement when he is shot in the back. To support himself, he sets up a private investigation practice out of his beach house on Coronado Island, in San Diego. Henry Darrow originally starred as Lt. Manny Quinlan, his friend and police contact.

For the second half of the first season, the series was retooled, with the location of the series shifted to Los Angeles, California, due to the high production costs of filming in and around San Diego. The retooling consisted of more than just a location change; a revised theme song and incidental music were composed and new supporting characters were added, notably the irascible Lt. Trench of the Santa Monica Police Department, who became Orwell's new foil/contact. (Henry Darrow's character, Lt. Quinlan, was killed off in a crossover episode.) Most noticeably, a lighter tone for the scripts and acting was adopted. Harry still lived in a beach cottage−this time somewhere along the Pacific Coast Highway between Malibu and Santa Monica. In "Reflections", episode five of season two, he gave the address as "1101 Coast Road" (this beach location was the same location used for the second pilot movie).

The second season had a further reworking of the opening credits and theme song, and recurring characters were added. Anthony Zerbe, who played Lt. Trench, won a Primetime Emmy Award for his role on the series.

Recurring characters included Farrah Fawcett-Majors, as Harry's attractive next-door neighbor and sometime girlfriend Sue Ingram/Ingham; Paul Tulley as Sgt. Roberts, Lt. Trench's assistant; Les Lannom as Lester Hodges, a bumbling private-eye wannabe; Tom Atkins as Sgt. Frank Cole; and Bill Henderson as Spencer Johnson, Harry's frustrated car mechanic.

Harry's small Austin-Healey, which spent almost all of the first season in non-running condition, later had more time on the road as the series progressed, though it was never entirely reliable. Also, in the San Diego episodes, the bullet in Harry's back noticeably impeded his ability to get around; by the second season, though the bullet's existence was mentioned in passing, Harry was miraculously able to run, jump, and engage in strenuous physical activity with seemingly no issues.

Reception and cancellation
Ratings for the series were initially fair, and they received a boost after the series was retooled in January 1975. Harry O was picked up for a second season and continued to gain viewership and critical acclaim. Then-ABC president Fred Silverman, though, decided to take the network in a different direction and cancelled the series in favor of Charlie's Angels. Farrah Fawcett-Majors, supporting player to Janssen's Harry O, was selected as one of the three stars of that new series.

The last original episode aired on April 29, 1976. The series' cancellation greatly disenchanted its star Janssen, who had found and shaped probably his most ideal character ever in Harry Orwell; he thus vowed never to participate in another television series again. He would do so, though, later, in the miniseries Centennial (1978–79).

Syndication
The show was rerun late at night on CBS during 1979-1980. It was run in syndication in the late 1980s on a few stations around the US and had a short-lived run on GoodLife TV Network in the early 2000s. The first pilot movie still receives occasional airings. 

The series is occasionally presented in weekend binges on the OTA television network Decades and on weekday afternoons on MeTV+.

Episodes

Pilot movies
Both pilot movies are set and were shot in Los Angeles.
With the exception of Harry Orwell, none of the recurring characters who would feature in the series appear in the pilot movies. The pilot movies also contain some details of Harry's backstory that clash with the character as established in the series.
Two of the actors who would feature in the series play different roles in Such Dust as Dreams are Made On; Les Lannom (who played Lester Hodges in the series) plays a student, while Mel Stewart (seen as Harry's mechanic Roy in the series) plays Harry's police contact, Sgt. Granger.
In the second pilot movie, Smile Jenny, You're Dead, Barbara Leigh (who appeared as Gina in the series) plays a character called Mildred. A character called Mildred also appeared in the first pilot movie, played by Marianna Hill.

Season 1: The San Diego episodes

Episodes 1-13 are set and were shot in San Diego.

The supporting cast for the San Diego episodes includes:
Henry Darrow as Lt. Manny Quinlan, Harry's sometimes antagonistic police contact
Tom Atkins as Sgt. Frank Cole, Quinlan's none-too-bright assistant (five episodes)
David Moses as Officer Billings, a patrolman often seen performing crime-scene duties (four episodes)
G.W. Bailey as Officer Remsen, a patrolman also often seen at crime scenes (three episodes) 
Mel Stewart as Roy Bardello, Harry's sarcastic mechanic (seen in two episodes, referenced in others)

Season 1: The Los Angeles episodes

Beginning with episode 14,  a change in format was made. Behind the scenes, new production staff members were brought in, and on-camera, the entire supporting cast was dropped. Filming moved from San Diego to Los Angeles. 
Episode 14 was a stand-alone story that sent Harry out to perform his investigations in a remote desert location.
From episode 15, Harry relocated to Los Angeles, moving his residence to the same location seen in the second pilot movie.

The supporting cast for the Los Angeles episodes (from episode 15) includes:
Anthony Zerbe as Lt. K.C. Trench, Harry's new police contact
Paul Tulley as Sgt. Roberts, Trench's quiet assistant
Hal Williams as Clarence, Harry's new mechanic (three episodes)
Kathrine Baumann as Betsy, one of a group of friendly stewardesses who live next door to Harry (three episodes)
Farrah Fawcett-Majors as Sue Ingram, another stewardess-next-door seen after Betsy leaves to marry her boyfriend (three episodes)

Sue's huge dog Grover appears in two episodes, as Harry is often forced to look after him while Sue is away. 
Betsy's massive boyfriend Walter is often mentioned, but never seen

Seen in one episode each were two characters who would become recurring players in season two: Les Lannom as amateur criminologist Lester Hodges, and Margaret Avery as friendly informant Ruby Dome.  Henry Darrow  also returned for one episode ("Elegy for a Cop") as Manny Quinlan.

Season 2
Season two remained in Los Angeles. Some changes were made to the supporting cast, and the theme was given a second radical rearrangement.

The season-two supporting cast includes:
Anthony Zerbe as Lt. K.C. Trench, Harry's police contact
Paul Tulley as Sgt. Roberts, Trench's assistant
Farrah Fawcett-Majors as Sue Ingham, Harry's neighbor (five episodes)
Bill Henderson as Spencer Johnson, Harry's frustrated mechanic (four episodes)
Richard Stahl as Dr. Carl Samuelson, a police pathologist (four episodes)
Les Lannom as Lester Hodges, an amateur criminologist who gets mixed up in Harry's cases (three episodes)
Margaret Avery as Ruby Dome (or Ruby Lawrence'), an informant with whom Harry is friendly (three episodes)
Susan Adams as Jean Parnell, a police laboratory technician (three episodes)
Barbara Leigh as Gina Walters, Harry's contact at the DMV (seen in two episodes, referenced in others)

Awards and nominations

Home media
On July 11, 2012, Warner Bros. released Harry O: The Complete First Season on DVD in region 1 via their Warner Archive Collection. This is a manufacture-on-demand (MOD) release, available exclusively through Warner's online store and only in the US. The 6-disc set features all 22 episodes of the season as well as the original pilot tele-film Such Dust as Dreams Are Made On. The second and final season was released by Warner Archive on February 5, 2013.

References

External links

1974 American television series debuts
1976 American television series endings
American Broadcasting Company original programming
1970s American crime television series
American detective television series
English-language television shows
Television series by Warner Bros. Television Studios
Television shows set in San Diego
Fictional portrayals of the San Diego Police Department